Knocknamuck is a mountain in County Tipperary, Ireland.

Etymology 
Its name means "Hill of the Pigs".

Geography 
At 340 metres (1,115 ft) Knocknamuck is highest summit in the Slieveardagh Hills and the 916th highest summit in Ireland.

References

See also
 List of mountains in Ireland

Mountains and hills of County Tipperary
Marilyns of Ireland